Györgyi Marvalics-Székely (1 December 1924 – 18 July 2002) was a Hungarian fencer. She won a silver medal in the women's team foil event at the 1960 Summer Olympics.

References

External links
 

1924 births
2002 deaths
Hungarian female foil fencers
Olympic fencers of Hungary
Fencers at the 1960 Summer Olympics
Olympic silver medalists for Hungary
Olympic medalists in fencing
Medalists at the 1960 Summer Olympics
People from Nagykanizsa
Sportspeople from Zala County
20th-century Hungarian women